Opera North is an opera company based at The Grand Theatre, Leeds. This article covers the period when the company's music director was Paul Daniel.

History 

The team of Paul Daniel and General Administrator Nicholas Payne brought a number of novelties to the ON repertoire before Payne's departure in 1993 to become Opera Director at the Royal Opera House, Covent Garden. There were British premieres of Roberto Gerhard's The Duenna and Franz Schreker's Der ferne Klang (directed by Brigitte Fassbaender) and the British professional premiere of Carl Nielsen's Maskarade. A number of arias written by Mozart for insertion into other composers' operas, together with some of his concert arias were brought together by Paul Griffiths as an opera entitled as The Jewel Box. Tchaikovsky's one-act Iolanta was reunited with his ballet The Nutcracker (performed by Matthew Bourne's Adventures in Motion Pictures) and first performed by Opera North on the 100th anniversary of their first performances in Saint Petersburg. Paul Dukas's Ariane et Barbe-bleue had its first British performance in over 50 years, and other unusual repertoire included Michael Tippett's King Priam, Chabrier's L'étoile and Rossini's The Thieving Magpie, as well as the world premiere of Robert Saxton's Caritas.

In 1993, Nicholas Payne was succeeded by Ian Ritchie, previously managing director of the Scottish Chamber Orchestra. The 1993–94 season included two more world premieres – Michael Berkeley's Baa-Baa Black Sheep, based on a story by Rudyard Kipling, and Benedict Mason's Playing Away, an opera about football which premiered at the Munich Biennale – as well as three neglected operas: Phyllida Lloyd's production of Benjamin Britten's Gloriana, David McVicar's production of Mozart's early Il re pastore, and Francesca Zambello's production of Puccini's La rondine. Ritchie, whose title had been general director, left the company in 1994 to freelance as an arts management consultant, and his successor was the current general director, Richard Mantle, who had previously worked for English National Opera, Scottish Opera and Edmonton Opera.

Notable among new productions during Paul Daniel's final three seasons as music director were Richard Jones's Pelléas et Mélisande (with Daniel's wife, Joan Rodgers, as Mélisande), Jonathan Miller's Il matrimonio segreto from Glimmerglass Opera, the British premiere of Chabrier's Le roi malgré lui, Verdi's first opera, Oberto (with John Tomlinson directing as well as playing the title character), William Walton's Troilus and Cressida, Luigi Cherubini's Médée in the composer's adaptation for Vienna and Ambroise Thomas's Hamlet, as well as Tannhäuser, Iphigénie en Aulide and Il ritorno d'Ulisse in patria. Following the success of Show Boat, the company staged another Broadway musical, Kurt Weill's Love Life.

Notable conductors appearing with the company during this period included Harry Bicket, Ivor Bolton, Oliver von Dohnányi, Claire Gibault, Roy Goodman, Alan Hacker, Richard Hickox, Diego Masson, Andrew Parrott, David Porcelijn, Carlo Rizzi and Antoni Ros-Marbà. Directors included Tim Albery, Annabel Arden, Tom Cairns, Martin Duncan, Caroline Gawn, Dalia Ibelhauptaitė, Helena Kaut-Howson, Jeremy Sams, Matthew Warchus and Deborah Warner.

Principal singers included sopranos Josephine Barstow, Susan Chilcott, Susannah Glanville, Mary Hegarty, Janis Kelly and Linda Kitchen, mezzo-sopranos Patricia Bardon, Alice Coote and Linda Finnie, tenors Barry Banks, Edmund Barham, Kim Begley, Philip Langridge, Paul Nilon and Christopher Ventris, baritones William Dazeley, Gerald Finley, Robert Hayward, Keith Latham, Anthony Michaels-Moore, Alan Opie and Eric Roberts, basses and bass-baritones Clive Bayley, Andrew Shore and Richard Van Allan,

Paul Daniel marked his departure to become music director of English National Opera with two concert performances of Erich Wolfgang Korngold's Violanta, one in Leeds and the other at The Proms. The soloists were Janice Cairns, Hans Aschenbach, Jonathan Summers, Stuart Kale and Liane Keegan. He left the company in September 1997 and, pending the appointment of a new music director, Elgar Howarth was designated music advisor.

Repertoire 
Below is a list of main stage operas performed by the company during this period.

See also 
 Opera North: history and repertoire, seasons 1978–79 to 1980–81
 Opera North: history and repertoire, seasons 1981–82 to 1989–90
 Opera North: history and repertoire, seasons 1997–98 to 2003–04
 Opera North: history and repertoire, seasons 2004–

References

Sources 

Opera North
Opera-related lists